, sometimes called Hada no Kōkatsu, was a legendary figure in Japanese folklore, who is believed to have introduced ritual Shinto dances to Japan in the sixth century. He is also considered the progenitor of a hereditary line which includes many of Noh's greatest playwrights and actors, such as Hata no Ujiyasu, Zeami and Komparu Mitsutarō. Though in legend he is portrayed as the reincarnation of the first emperor of Qin, if Kawakatsu truly existed he was likely a Chinese immigrant to Japan, or someone from further afield who came to Japan via China (see Hata tribe).

Legend
According to legend, as told by the preeminent Noh playwright Zeami, Hata no Kawakatsu first appeared as a child, during the reign of Emperor Kinmei (509–571), discovered in a jar near the gates to the Miwa Shrine by a high court official. The Hatsuse River had overflowed its banks, and the jar had been carried along on the current. As the official believed the child to have come from heaven, these events were reported to the emperor. That night the emperor dreamed of the child, who said that he was the spirit of Qin Shihuangdi, first Emperor of Qin, reborn. The child also explained his appearance in the dream as a result of his destiny being connected to Japan's.

As a result, the child was brought to the Court, by order of the Emperor, to serve as a Minister. He was given the family name of Chin (Qin), which was read as Hata in Japanese, and it was thus that the child came to be called Hata no Kawakatsu. Kawakatsu was then asked by Shōtoku Taishi to perform sixty-six dramatic pieces, in order to help settle disturbances in the land. The Prince made sixty-six masks to be used for this purpose, and the performances were then done at the Shishinden (Great Attendance Hall) of the imperial palace at Tachibana. Since this was successful in creating peace for the land, Prince Shōtoku decided that this form of entertainment should be kept for the ages, and dubbed it kagura ("entertainment given by the gods"). The form of entertainment known as sarugaku, along with its name, would later be derived from kagura.

Kawakatsu is said to have served a number of rulers, including not only Kimmei and Shōtoku, but Emperor Bidatsu, Emperor Yōmei, Emperor Sushun, and Empress Suiko. Having passed on his art to his descendants, Kawakatsu fled Naniwa in a hollowed-out wooden boat. The winds and currents took him to Harima Province, where he came ashore no longer in human form. It is not clear from Zeami's version of the tale what sort of spirit or demon Kawakatsu was meant to have been, but it is implied that from the time he was discovered in the jar to this point he was never truly human. In any case, he haunted and cursed the people of Harima until they began to worship him as a kami, in order to placate him. They called him Taikō Dai-Myōjin ("Great Raging Kami"), and later recognized him as an incarnation of Bishamonten. Prince Shōtoku is said to have prayed to the spirit of Kawakatsu for victory against Mononobe no Moriya, who led an armed force in opposition to Japanese adoption of Buddhism.

Konparu Zenchiku considered Kawakatsu to be a manifestation of the shukujin, a universal god of destiny. According to Zenchiku, Taiko Daimyojin can also be considered to be analogous to the deity Matarajin, formerly commonly worshiped by the Tendai school of Japanese Buddhism and associated with various performing arts, especially sarugaku and noh. The Kōryūji temple in Kyoto, according to legend created by Kawakatsu, is considered a prominent site of Matarajin worship.

References

Rimer, J. Thomas and Yamazaki Masakazu trans. (1984). "On the Art of the Nō Drama: The Major Treatises of Zeami". Princeton, New Jersey: Princeton University Press.

Japanese mythology
Noh
Deified Japanese people